Bedekovčina is a village and municipality in the Krapina-Zagorje County in Croatia. It is connected by the state road D24 and R201 railway. In the 2011 census, the total population of the municipality was 8,041, in the following settlements:

 Bedekovčina, population 3,400
 Belovar Zlatarski, population 102
 Brestovec Orehovički, population 334
 Grabe, population 421
 Kebel, population 414
 Križanče, population 141
 Lug Orehovički, population 223
 Lug Poznanovečki, population 659
 Martinec Orehovički, population 393
 Orehovica, population 237
 Poznanovec, population 937
 Pustodol Orehovički, population 302
 Vojnić-Breg, population 146
 Zadravec, population 120
 Židovinjak, population 212

In the 2011 census, the absolute majority were Croats.

References

Populated places in Krapina-Zagorje County
Municipalities of Croatia